Septobasidium gaoligongense is a plant pathogenic fungus in the genus Septobasidium. It was first isolated from Eurya groffii.

References

External links

MycoBank

Fungal plant pathogens and diseases
Teliomycotina